Gérard Guazzini (born 11 September 1966) is a French former professional racing cyclist. He rode the 1994 Tour de France.

References

External links
 

1966 births
Living people
French male cyclists
People from Martigues
Sportspeople from Bouches-du-Rhône
Cyclists from Provence-Alpes-Côte d'Azur